Jameson Park and Rose Garden  is a rose garden located in Durban, South Africa.

Once being a pineapple plantation, it currently possesses about 200 species of roses which are prominent in the South African Spring months of September to November.

External links
 City of Durban official website

Gardens in South Africa
Tourist attractions in Durban